The 1929 Tulsa Golden Hurricane football team represented the University of Tulsa during the 1929 college football season. In their fifth year under head coach Gus Henderson, the Golden Hurricane compiled a 6–3–1 record, won the Big Four Conference championship, and outscored their opponents by a total of 107 to 81.

Schedule

References

Tulsa
Tulsa Golden Hurricane football seasons
Tulsa Golden Hurricane football